The 1927 Copa del Rey Final was the 27th final of the Spanish cup competition, the Copa del Rey. The final was played at Torrero, in Zaragoza, on 15 May 1927. Real Unión beat Arenas Club de Getxo 1–0 and won their fourth and last title. The only goal of the match was scored in extra-time by José Echeveste.

Summary
On 15 May, the Real Unión de Irún played against the Arenas Club de Guecho at the Estadio Torrero, Zaragoza, which presented a packed stadium at five in the afternoon. This meeting went down in history because it was the first to be broadcast on the radio, specifically by Unión Radio de Madrid. The Irundarras, who had two great figures of the time in their team, such as Gamborenea and René Petit, the latter as an offensive reference, beat Sporting de Gijón in the quarter-finals and then in the semifinal they eliminated Real Madrid with a 2–0 win, courtesy of Gamborenea and Echeveste. On the other hand, Arenas had eliminated Celta de Vigo and FC Barcelona in a single-leg semi-final. This victory was especially heartfelt because Arenas were taking revenge for what happened in 1925 when the Catalans took the Cup after beating Arenas 2–0 in the final. The game was tight and René Petit had a golden chance from 12 yards, but he failed to convert a penalty that would have done justice to Unión. The game thus ended with a goalless draw in its 90 regulation minutes, which forced extra time, where Irundarras still managed to find when Echeveste, after receiving a pass from Villaverde, scored the only goal of the match with just three minutes to go.

Match details

See also
Basque football derbies

References

1927
Copa
Real Unión matches
Arenas Club de Getxo matches